A hambar  is a corn crib or small building commonly used for storing and drying maize in the Balkans and the neighboring regions in the Pannonian plain and north of the Danube. The word comes from Turkish ambar, meaning "storehouse, warehouse, repository", from the Greek nautical term ἀμπάρι (ampari), meaning "stowage". The word and the concept are used in Europe as far north as Hungary and the White Sea in Russia. 

In Hebrew, the word אמבר (pronounced AMBAR) means a storage place for wheat.  The word does not appear in the Bible.

See also
Hórreo, the equivalent construction in Northern Spain.

Notes and references

Turkish words and phrases
History of agriculture
Balkans
Culture of Vojvodina
Serbian culture
Granaries